Tetrabrachium ocellatum (four-armed frogfish) is a species of anglerfish, closely related to the true frogfishes. It is the only member of its genus.

It has prehensile pectoral fins, helping it to move along the seabed, and giving it its "four-armed" appearance. It lives in shallow waters, around  depth, off the coasts of New Guinea, Indonesia, and Australia.

References

Lophiiformes
Monotypic marine fish genera
Taxa named by Albert Günther